SPINA-GR is a calculated biomarker for insulin sensitivity. It represents insulin receptor gain.

How to determine GR
The index is derived from a mathematical model of insulin-glucose homeostasis. For diagnostic purposes, it is calculated from fasting insulin and glucose concentrations with:

.

[I](∞): Fasting Insulin plasma concentration (μU/mL)
[G](∞): Fasting blood glucose concentration (mg/dL)
G1: Parameter for pharmacokinetics (154.93 s/L)
DR: EC50 of insulin at its receptor (1,6 nmol/L)
GE: Effector gain (50 s/moL)
P(∞): Constitutive endogenous glucose production (150 µmol/s)

Clinical significance

Validity
Compared to healthy volunteers, SPINA-GR is significantly reduced in persons with prediabetes and diabetes mellitus, and it correlates with the M value in glucose clamp studies, triceps skinfold, subscapular skinfold and (better than HOMA-IR and QUICKI) with the two-hour value in oral glucose tolerance testing (OGTT), glucose rise in OGTT, waist-to-hip ratio, body fat content (measured via DXA) and the HbA1c fraction.

Pathophysiological implications
In lean subjects it is significantly higher than in a population with obese persons.

See also 

 SPINA-GBeta
 SPINA-GD
 SPINA-GT
 Homeostatic model assessment
 QUICKI

Notes

References

External links
 Functions for R and S for calculating SPINA-GBeta and SPINA-GR. (Permanent DOI)

Diabetes
Endocrinology
Human homeostasis
Endocrine procedures
Static endocrine function tests